A black hole is a region of spacetime where gravity is so strong that nothing – no particles or even electromagnetic radiation such as light – can escape from it. A black hole is formed when a star 25 times bigger than the sun explodes in a supernova. Or it can also be formed when two neutron stars collide with each other. The biggest black hole in the universe is TON-618. 

Black hole may also refer to:

Computing 
Black hole (networking), in computer networking, a place where traffic is silently discarded
Blackhole server, a DNS server that handles reverse lookups of invalid IP ranges
A storage engine provided by MySQL data

Film and television
The Black Hole (1979 film), a 1979 science fiction film
Black Holes (film), a 1995 film
The Black Hole (2006 film), a science fiction film
Black Hole (2015 film), a documentary film
The Black Hole (2016 film), a 2016 science fiction thriller
Black Hole (House), a 2010 episode of House

Games 
Black Hole (pinball), a 1981 pinball machine manufactured by Gottlieb
Black Hole (1981 video game), an arcade game by TDS
Blackhole (video game), a 2015 video game by FiolaSoft Studio
Black Hole (2018 video game), a video game by Dufgames
Black Hole (solitaire), a solitaire card game
Black Hole Entertainment, a video game developer
Black Hole (board game), a 1978 two-player space combat game published by Metagaming Concepts 
A faction in the Advance Wars games

Music 
Black Hole Recordings, a record label
Blackhole (band), a British hardcore punk band
The Black Hole (album), an album by Misty's Big Adventure
"Black Hole" (song), a song by Griff from One Foot in Front of the Other, 2021
"Blackhole", a song by Beck from Mellow Gold
"Black Hole", a song by Band-Maid from Unseen World
"Black Hole", a song by Ana Johnsson from The Way I Am
"Black Hole", a song by Lindsay Lohan from A Little More Personal (Raw)
"Black Hole", a song by Wussy from What Heaven Is Like

Places 
Black Hole of Calcutta, a dungeon in which many British troops and various civilians allegedly died in 1756
Black Hole of Hong Kong, a prison cell in which 47 Chinese men were detained for three weeks during the Esing Bakery incident of 1857
A section of White Canyon, Utah

Other uses 
Black Hole (comics), a limited series comic by Charles Burns
Black Hole (DC Comics), a fictional terrorist organization
Black Hole (Kinnikuman), a character in the manga and anime Kinnikuman
Black Hole (roller coaster), a (defunct) rollercoaster at Alton Towers
A sensory illusion in aviation
A surplus store in Los Alamos, New Mexico, operated by Ed Grothus
An area of the home stadium of the Las Vegas Raiders

See also
DNSBL (DNS-based Black Hole List), a list used to block spamming IP addresses
Micro black hole, a black hole on a quantum level or with quantum effects